The Light Infantry Volunteers was short lived a Territorial Army infantry regiment of the British Army, that existed from 1967 to 1972, composed of companies from the Light Infantry regiments. In 1972, it was re-designated as 5th Battalion, The Light Infantry, serving as such until amalgamation in 1999.

History
Upon the creation of the TAVR, and the reduction of territorial units, the regiment was formed through the amalgamation of the Light Infantry Brigade Territorial battalions, namely: 4th Battalion, King's Shropshire Light Infantry; Duke of Cornwall's Light Infantry (TA); 4th Battalion, King's Own Yorkshire Light Infantry; 1st Battalion, Herefordshire Light Infantry; and 6th/8th Battalion, Durham Light Infantry. Upon formation, the regiment's structure was as follows:
HQ Company (Shropshire), at Shrewsbury(reduction of 4th Battalion, King's Own Shropshire Light Infantry)
A Company (Cornwall), at Truro and Bodmin(reduction of Duke of Cornwall's Light Infantry (TA))
B Company (Yorkshire), at Wakefield(reduction of 4th Battalion, King's Own Yorkshire Light Infantry)
C Company (Herefordshire), at Hereford(reduction of 1st Battalion, Herefordshire Light Infantry)
D Company (Durham), at Durham(reduction of 6th/8th Battalion, Durham Light Infantry)

In 1969, a fifth rifle company (E Company (Durham)) was raised at Spennymoor and Bishop Auckland, from a cadre of 6th/8th Battalion, Durham Light Infantry. In 1975, however, this was transferred to 7th Battalion, Light Infantry, as D Company; and a new E Company was formed at Wellington and Whitchurch, from C Company, Light Infantry and Mercian Volunteers.

5th Battalion, The Light Infantry
1972, saw the regiment cease to exist, and be re-designated as the 5th Battalion, The Light Infantry with the same structure it held previously.

In 1981, A and D Companies were swapped with D Company, 6th Battalion and the C Company, 7th Battalion respectively. And in 1987, upon the raising of the 8th Battalion, A and B Companies both transferred to the new battalion as B Company and A Company respectively; however they were replaced not long after- A Company, being newly raised at Shrewsbury; and B Company, from the re designation of E Company. After all these changed, and a title change to 5th (Shropshire and Herefordshire) Battalion, The Light Infantry, in 1988, the battalion now possessed the following structure:
HQ Company, at Shrewsbury
A Company, at Copthorne Barracks, Shrewsbury
B Company, at Wellington
C Company, at Hereford
D Company, at Ross-on-Wye

In line with the reduction of the armed forces after the end of the Cold War, the battalion was reduced to a three rifle company establishment, with A and D Companies being disbanded, with A Company being replaced by B Company, 4th (V) Battalion, Worcestershire and Sherwood Foresters Regiment, retaining its regimental identity.

The Battalion was amalgamated with 5th Battalion, Royal Regiment of Fusiliers; and 3rd Battalion, Staffordshire Regiment, in 1999, to form the West Midlands Regiment. A Company became B Company of the new regiment, HQ and C Company amalgamated to form E Company, and B Company disbanded.

References

Military units and formations established in 1967
Military units and formations disestablished in 1975
Military units and formations disestablished in 1999
King's Own Yorkshire Light Infantry

Duke of Cornwall's Light Infantry

Durham Light Infantry
The Light Infantry
Infantry regiments of the British Army
1967 establishments in England